The Third Lover (original title: L'Œil du malin, or The Eye of the Crafty Devil, also known as The Eye of Evil) is a 1962 drama directed by Claude Chabrol. It is one of Chabrol's first films to include social criticism on bourgeoisie lifestyles that would become one of his trademarks in later films. It tells the story of a journalist in southern Germany who is befriended by a novelist and his wife and gradually begins to destroy the couple's lives.

Plot
Albin, a solitary French journalist who knows little of women or of the world, rents a house in a village outside Munich that is home to the respected and rich writer Andreas. In the shop he meets Hélène, a beautiful Frenchwoman who is married to Andreas. She and her husband befriend their new neighbour, who becomes besotted with Hélène. When she tactfully fobs him off, he reasons that she already has a lover and follows her. His hunch proves right when at the Oktoberfest he sees her with another man and later, trailing the two, he takes compromising photographs. Confronting Hélène with the photographs, she tells him that Andreas knows already and begs him to stop. But he will not stop and takes the photographs to Andreas, who is devastated. When Hélène gets home, Andreas beats and kills her.

Cast
Jacques Charrier as Albin Mercier.
Walter Reyer as Andréas Hartmann.
Stéphane Audran as Hélène.
Daniel Boulanger as the Commissioner

References

External links

1962 films
Films shot in Germany
French crime drama films
Films directed by Claude Chabrol
1962 crime drama films
Films set in West Germany
1960s French films